The University of Nairobi (uonbi or UoN) is a collegiate research university based in Nairobi. It is the largest university in Kenya. Although its history as an educational institution dates back to 1956, it did not become an independent university until 1970. During that year, the University of East Africa was split into three independent universities: Makerere University in Uganda, the University of Dar es Salaam in Tanzania, and the University of Nairobi in Kenya.

During the 2023 academic year, the university had 49,047 students, of whom 35,897 were undergraduates and 11,003 postgraduates. The university launched several policy frameworks and introduced self-funded enrollment (also called 'module 2') to cope with the rising demand for higher education in Kenya.

As of 2023, University of Nairobi reported that it had more than 49,047 enrolled students.

Establishment
The inception of the University of Nairobi dates back to 1956, with the establishment of the Royal Technical College, which admitted its first group of A-level graduates for technical courses in April the same year. The Royal Technical College was transformed into the second university college in East Africa on 25 June 1961 by the Scottish mathematician Professor James Morton Hyslop, formerly of the University of Witwatersrand under the name Royal College of Nairobi. It joined the University of London's 'schemes of special relations' and began preparing students in the faculties of Arts, Science and Engineering for University of London award degrees. Meanwhile, students in other faculties such as the Faculty of Special Professional Studies (later renamed Faculty of Commerce) and Faculty of Architecture continued to offer diplomas for qualifications of professional bodies/institutions.

On 20 May 1964, the Royal College of Nairobi was renamed University College Nairobi as a constituent college of the Federal University of East Africa. During this time, enrolled students studied for college degrees awarded by the University of East Africa instead of the University of London. In 1970, it transformed into the first national university in Kenya and was renamed the University of Nairobi. The university tops in Kenya's university ranking. It is ranked 7th in Africa and 1698 in the world according to Webometrics Ranking of World Universities.

History

The idea of an institution for higher learning in Kenya goes back to 1947 when the Kenya government drew up a plan for the establishment of a technical and commercial institute in Nairobi. By 1949, this plan had grown into a concept aimed at providing higher technical education for Kenya. In September 1951, a Royal Charter was issued to the Royal Technical College, Nairobi and the foundation stone of the college was laid in April 1952.

During the same period, the Asian Community of Kenya was also planning to build a college for Arts, Science and Commerce as a memorial to Mahatma Gandhi. To avoid duplication of efforts, Gandhi Memorial Academy Society partnered with Kenyan Governments. Thus, the Gandhi Memorial Academy was incorporated into the Royal Technical College, Nairobi in April 1954, and the college proceeded to open its doors to the first intake of students in April 1956.

Soon after the arrival of students at the college, the pattern of higher education in Kenya came under scrutiny. Through the recommendation of a working party formed in 1958, chaired by the Vice-Chancellor of the University of London, Sir John Lockwood, the Royal Technical College, Nairobi was transformed. On 25 June 1961, the college became the second university college in East Africa, under the name "Royal College Nairobi."

The Royal College Nairobi was renamed "University College, Nairobi" on 20 May 1964. On the attainment of "University College" status, the institution prepared students for bachelor's degrees awarded by the University of London, while also continuing to offer college diploma programmes. The University College Nairobi provided educational opportunities in this capacity until 1966 when it began preparing students exclusively for degrees of the University of East Africa, with the exception of the Department of Domestic Science. With effect from 1 July 1970, the University of East Africa was dissolved and the three African countries of Kenya, Uganda and Tanzania each had its own national universities. This development saw the birth of the University of Nairobi set up by an Act of Parliament.Since 1970, the university had grown from a faculty based university serving a student population of 2,768 to a college focused university serving over 68,000 students.

Profile
It is a body corporate established under the Universities Act 2012 of the Laws of Kenya and the Charter.  

Through module II and III programmes, opportunity has been opened to thousands of Kenyans and foreigners especially from Sudan, on a paying basis, who meet university admission requirements, but who have not been able to access university education due to restricted intake into the regular programmes that is determined by limited resource allocation by Government. In addition to the regular and evening and weekend programmes, classes are conducted at the University's Extra-Mural Centres located at the country's county headquarters.

The university is admitting students to undertake courses in the proposed Koitalel Arap Samoei University College for law, business management and education courses that began in January 2015. This is a joint project of the County Government of Nandi and the University of Nairobi

Restructuring
The university underwent a major restructuring in 1983, resulting in  decentralization of the administration, by the creation of six colleges headed by principals. Further, in 2021, the university was further restructured to faculties headed by Executive Deans, phasing out the colleges.

Faculties

 Veterinary Medicine
 Social Sciences
 Science and Technology
 Law
 Agriculture
 Business and Management Science
 Education
 Arts
 Engineering
 Built Environment and Design
 Health Sciences

Departments

 Agricultural Economics
 Food Science, Nutrition And Technology
 Land Resource Management And Agricultural Technology
 Plant Science & Crop Protection
 Linguistics, Languages and Literature
 History and Archeology
 Philosophy and Religious Studies
 Library and Information
 Art and Design
 Architecture
 Real Estate, Construction Management and Quantity Surveying
 Urban and Regional Planning
 Business Administration
 Finance & Accounting
 Management Science and Project Planning
 Educational Management, Policy and Curriculum Studies
 Educational Foundations
 Educational Communication And Pedagogical Studies
 Educational and Distance Studies
 Physical Education And Sport
 Mechanical and Manufacturing Engineering
 Civil and Construction Engineering
 Electrical and Information Engineering
 Environmental and Biosystems Engineering
 Geospatial and Space Technology
 Dental Sciences
 Nursing Sciences
 Public and Global Health
 Surgery
 Human Anatomy and Physiology
 Clinical Medicine and Therapeutics
 Paediatrics and Child Health
 Obstetrics and Gynaecology
 Human Pathology
 Psychiatry
 Diagnostic Imaging and Radiation Medicine
 Medical Microbiology and Immunology
 Pharmacy
 Chemistry
 Computing and Informatics
 Mathematics
 Physics
 Biology
 Earth and Climate Sciences
 Biochemistry
 Anthropology, Gender and African Studies
 Economics, Population and Development Studies
 Sociology, Social Work and African Women Studies
 Political Science, Diplomacy and Public Administration
 Journalism and Mass Communication
 Public Health, Pharmacology and Toxicology
 Veterinary Anatomy and Physiology
 Animal Production
 Clinical Studies
 Veterinary Pathology, Microbiology and Parasitology

Rankings 

In 2017, Times Higher Education ranked the university within the 801–1000 band globally.

Notable alumni

 
 
Kawango Agot, researcher and HIV specialist
Elijah Ateka, Professor of Plant Virology
Avril, singer and actress
Stellah Wairimu Bosire-Otieno, physician and corporate executive
Ali Rasso Dido, National Assembly member
Zipporah Gathuya, pediatric anesthesiologist
Githinji Kiama Gitahi, physician and Global Chief Executive Officer, Amref Health Africa
Robert Gichimu Githinji, Member of Parliament
James Gita Hakim, professor of medicine, cardiologist and HIV clinical trialist
Patrick R. D. Hayford, diplomat, former Ghana Ambassador to South Africa(1997–1999), Director of African Affairs in the Executive Office of United Nations (UN) Secretary-General Kofi Annan(1999–2005)
Philo Ikonya, author and human rights activist
Wahu Kagwe, singer, actress, songwriter, entertainer
Jacob Kaimenyi, former Cabinet Secretary Education, Lands & Natural resources. Academicians 
Michael Kamau, Cabinet Secretary 
Dr Jemimah Kariuki, gynaecologist 
Dr Thomas Kariuki, Director of Programmes at the African Academy of Sciences
Maina Kiai, human rights activist and UN Special Rapporteur
Felix Koskei, former Cabinet Secretary, Kenya. 
Joseph Ole Lenku, former Cabinet Secretary and Governor Kajiado County. 
PLO Lumumba, Professor of Law
Wangari Maathai, Nobel peace prize laureate
Emma Mbua, palaeo anthropologist and curator
James Wainaina Macharia, Cabinet Secretary. 
Fred Matiangi, Cabinet Secretary. 
Adan Mohammed, Cabinet Secretary. 
Musalia Mudavadi, former Vice President under President Moi, former Deputy Prime Minister to Rt Hon. Raila Odinga. 
Sylvia Mulinge, corporate executive
Margaret Muthwii, Vice-Chancellor of Pan Africa Christian University
Willy Mutunga, former Chief Justice of Kenya
MaryJane Mwangi, corporate executive
John Nasasira, Ugandan Cabinet Minister
Ruth W. Nduati, physician and HIV researcher
Eva Njenga, physician and first female chair of Kenya Medical Practitioners and Dentists Board
Freda Nkirote, archaeologist and Director of the British Institute in Eastern Africa (BIEA) and President of the Pan-African Archaeological Association.
Apolo Nsibambi, Prime Minister of Uganda
Shitsama Nyamweya, neurosurgeon
Joe Nyangon, Engineer, energy economist and clean energy technology expert
Borna Nyaoke-Anoke, physician and medical researcher
Catherine Nyongesa, physician and radiation oncologist
Washington Yotto Ochieng, Professor of Engineering at Imperial College London
Troy Onyango, writer and lawyer
James Orengo, long serving Kenyan legislator and senior council. 
Teodosia Osir, lawyer and corporate executive
Babu Owino, politician
Henry Rotich, Kenya's Finance Cabinet Secretary. 
William Ruto, President Elect Republic of Kenya.
Stephen Sang, constitutional lawyer and the Second Governor of Nandi County 
Josephine Sinyo, Kenyan lawyer, politician and disability rights activist 
Anne Waiguru, former Cabinet Secretary and Governor of Kirinyaga County. 
Hassan Wario, anthropologist, former Cabinet Secretary, Kenya and serving Kenyan ambassador. .

See also
 University of Newcastle, Australia
 University of Nottingham
 University of Northampton

==References==

External links 
 

 
Educational institutions established in 1956
Educational institutions established in 1961
Educational institutions established in 1964
Educational institutions established in 1970
Universities and colleges in Kenya
1956 establishments in Kenya